The men's C-1 1000 metres event was an open-style, individual canoeing event conducted as part of the Canoeing at the 1980 Summer Olympics program.

Medallists

Results

Heats
Thirteen competitors were entered with one withdrawal and one disqualification. Held on July 31, the top three finishers in each heat moved on to the final with the others relegated to the semifinal.

Lassen's disqualification was not disclosed in the official report.

Semifinal
Taking place on August 2, the top three finishers in the semifinal advanced to the final.

Final
The final took place on August 2.

References
1980 Summer Olympics official report Volume 3. p. 191. 
Sports-reference.com 1980 C-1 1000 m results.

Men's C-1 1000
Men's events at the 1980 Summer Olympics